Freddy Romano (born 25 July 1966) is an Italian freestyle skier. He competed at the 1994 Winter Olympics and the 1998 Winter Olympics.

References

1966 births
Living people
Italian male freestyle skiers
Olympic freestyle skiers of Italy
Freestyle skiers at the 1994 Winter Olympics
Freestyle skiers at the 1998 Winter Olympics
Sportspeople from Bern
20th-century Italian people